FK Sloboden Skopje (Macedonian: ФК Слободен Скопје), or simply Sloboden, is a football club based in the city of Skopje, North Macedonia. They are currently competing in the OFL Kisela Voda, the 4th tier of the Macedonian football pyramid. Since January 2023 the club moved its home ground at the AMS Trubarevo stadium in the settlement of Trubarevo.

History 
The club was founded in June 2022. Originally, FK Sloboden was an inside joke from 2020, when a Twitter user mistook the word Слободен (free in English) in a youth team fixture list to be an actual football club, rather than the term used to mean that a club got a bye for that round. After initially using the spare pitch near the Železarnica Stadium to train and play their friendly matches, they moved to the football ground "Jurja" in the Skopje settlement of Usje where they played their home matches in the opening half of the 2022-23 season.

Current squad
As of 25 February 2023.

Players with multiple nationalities

 Tigran Kandikyan
 Marios Mitropetros
 Jorgos Mitropetros

Coaches 
 Stefan Mihajlov (Sep 2022 - Jan 2023)
 Filip Jakjimoski (Feb 2023 - current)

References

External links 

Club info at MacedonianFootball 

Sloboden
Football clubs in Skopje
Sloboden
Sloboden